Eulepidotis albistriata is a moth of the family Erebidae first described by George Hampson in 1926. It is found in the Neotropical realm, including the Brazilian state of Amazonas.

References

Moths described in 1926
albistriata